The Quaker State 400 presented by Walmart is a NASCAR Cup Series stock car race that was run annually each March at Atlanta Motor Speedway in Hampton, Georgia from 1960 to 2010 and as a July race since 2021. The race was the first of two races held at the Atlanta track every season, with the Dixie 500, being the second and run at various times (originally November, later October and currently the second race of the season), now run as the Folds of Honor QuikTrip 500.

In August 2010, Atlanta Motor Speedway announced that they would no longer run the spring race, instead choosing to focus on the Labor Day weekend race at the track beginning in 2011. The end of the Atlanta 500 permitted the addition of a race at Kentucky Speedway starting in 2011, primarily from litigation by Kentucky's former owners and a settlement of that trial.

On September 30, 2020, Speedway Motorsports announced Kentucky would lose its Cup race and the event be moved back to Atlanta, to be held July 11, 2021. When the start times for all of NASCAR's events were announced, due to recommendation by fans and the track, the event will be held under the lights in 2023.

Notable races
1960: The first race at Atlanta International Raceway (now Atlanta Motor Speedway) was won by Bobby Johns in a 1960 Pontiac.
1961: Bob Burdick led 44 laps to his only career Grand National win. Polesitter Marvin Panch led 127 laps but faded to sixth, while Fred Lorenzen led 87 laps but fell out with engine failure. Rookie Bobby Allison finished 37th.
1964: Lorenzen led the last 168 laps and 206 in all to a two-lap win amid an epidemic of tire failures and resultant crashes; Paul Goldsmith led the first 54 laps but blew a tire, smashed the guardrail, and flipped over.
1966: Jim Hurtubise led the final 58 laps to his only career Grand National win.
1971: A. J. Foyt outdueled Richard Petty for his fifth career win.
1972: Bobby Allison posted the first win for Chevrolet on a superspeedway since the 1960s, as he held off a strong challenge from Foyt and Bobby Isaac.
1974: Cale Yarborough grabbed the lead when David Pearson pitted under green and was trapped by an ill-timed yellow; the race was shortened to  due to the energy crisis.
1975: After winning the Dixie 500 four times, Richard Petty edged Buddy Baker for his first Atlanta 500 win.
1976: Pearson lost a lap early and spent 225 laps getting it back before winning. Yarborough lost four laps on a green-flag stop and got three of them back to finish third.
1977: Richard Petty, David Pearson, and Cale Yarborough finished 1–2–3 as they combined to lead all 328 laps. Yarborough finished third after his brakes wore out and at times he had to be stopped by Richard Childress' car on pit road.  Only two yellows flew.
1979: Buddy Baker caught a late yellow, got four tires, and won in a late sprint, his first win since 1976.
1980: Sophomore Dale Earnhardt took the lead with 30 to go after Cale Yarborough broke while chasing down Bobby Allison.  USAC stock car racer Rusty Wallace finished a strong second.  Donnie Allison crashed out of the lead with sophomore Terry Labonte in what became his final race for car owner Hoss Ellington.
1981: Yarborough posted his first win for car owner M.C. Anderson, but the story of the race was a loud protest by Bobby Allison over NASCAR-mandated reduction of the spoiler of his 1981 Pontiac Lemans to reduce the car's aerodynamic efficiency.  Car owner Harry Ranier threatened to boycott the race but got no support in the garage area and relented to the rule change.
1982: After Dale Earnhardt fell out rain hit the race and Darrell Waltrip edged Richard Petty to the race-ending yellow.
1983: Cale Yarborough drove a backup car to victory for the second time in 1983.  He'd wrecked his primary Ranier Chevy a week earlier in Rockingham and used a car that had been a show car.
1984: Benny Parsons posted his final win.
1986: Morgan Shepherd outran Dale Earnhardt for his first win in five years and the first of three wins at Atlanta.
1987: Dale Earnhardt fell out late and Ricky Rudd edged Parsons and Rusty Wallace for his first win on an oval bigger than one mile (1.6 km).
1989: Darrell Waltrip came back from nearly a lap down to win; on a mid-race yellow Waltrip was slowed by the pace car picking up the wrong leader during pitstops and was trapped barely on the lead lap.  The mishap led to the implementation of a rule closing pit road when the yellow comes out; the rule was designed to stop cars from pitting before taking the yellow, which was blamed for scoring mistakes in the days of manual lap scoring.  Also, during this race, Richard Petty made a pit stop and his car caught fire injuring his gasman and leaving Dr. Jerry Punch some singed hairs (after this, pit reporters are required to wear firesuits).
1992: Bill Elliott won in unlikely fashion as a yellow trapped the entire field behind him a lap down during green flag stops in the final 30 laps.
1993:  A major snowstorm, Superstorm 93, had the race (scheduled for March 14) rescheduled for March 20 with Morgan Shepard taking the win.
1995: Jeff Gordon posted his second win of 1995 on his way to his first title.
1997: Dale Jarrett dominated in a race where Steve Grissom tore open a concrete wall, flipped over, and his fuel cell hit the outside wall and erupted in flame.
1998: Bobby Labonte took the win in a race delayed to Monday by rain and in a weekend that saw numerous driver injuries, notably Mike Skinner and Derrike Cope.
2000: Dale Earnhardt edged Labonte by inches after Skinner dominated the race but blew up.
2001: Kevin Harvick edged Gordon by inches in his first win for RCR after Earnhardt's death. Although he was assigned a different number, Harvick used the same car and team Earnhardt won with the previous year. Prior to Earnhardt's death; this race was intended to be Harvick's Winston Cup debut as he was originally scheduled to run part-time in 2001 before moving to the Winston Cup Series full-time in 2002.
2002: Tony Stewart posted his first  win.
2005: Carl Edwards slithered past Jimmie Johnson on the final lap to score his first career win and also sweeps the weekend at Atlanta.
2006: Bill Lester becomes the first African-American driver to race in a NASCAR Nextel Cup Series event since Willy T. Ribbs in 1986. Kasey Kahne would later on win this race and becomes the first of many wins for Kasey Kahne in 2006.
2007: It was the last race that the "old" racecar was run consecutively. The Car of Tomorrow would debut next week at Bristol.  Also it was Mark Martin's last consecutive race that he had participated in since 1991.
2008: Kyle Busch won, giving Toyota their first win in the NASCAR Sprint Cup Series. It was the first time a foreign auto maker won since Jaguar in 1954. It was also Kyle's first win under the Joe Gibbs Racing banner.
2009: Kurt Busch dominated the race after a pit crew mistake by one of Marcos Ambrose's crewman trapped most of the cars that could challenge him a lap down.
2010: A scary flight by Brad Keselowski was a top story; Keselowski was spun out by the lapped car of Carl Edwards and nearly struck the fencing past the start-finish line in the final laps. This was also the last spring race at Atlanta until the track's surviving summer-autumn race was moved to March in 2015.

Past winners

Notes
1962 & 1982: Race shortened due to rain.
1974: Race shortened due to energy crisis.
1991: Race started on Sunday but was finished on Monday due to rain.
1993: Race postponed one week due to snow from Blizzard of '93.
1997: Last race on Atlanta's original configuration.
1998 & 2006: Race postponed from Sunday to Monday due to rain.
2009 & 2010: Race extended due to a green–white–checker finish. 2010 race took 2 attempts.

Track length notes
1960–1969: 1.5 mile course
1970–1997: 1.522 mile course
1998–2010, 2021–: 1.54 mile course

Multiple winners (drivers)

Manufacturers wins

References

External links
 

1960 establishments in Georgia (U.S. state)
 
Recurring sporting events established in 1960
NASCAR Cup Series races